Isidora Niemeyer (born 26 December 2001) is a Chilean rower.

Niemeyer competed at the 2019 Pan American Games where she won a gold medal in the Women's Quadruple sculls event and a silver medal in the Lightweight Women's Double Sculls event. She also competed at the 2018 Youth Olympics.

References

2001 births
Living people
Chilean female rowers
Rowers at the 2018 Summer Youth Olympics
Pan American Games medalists in rowing
Pan American Games gold medalists for Chile
Pan American Games silver medalists for Chile
Rowers at the 2019 Pan American Games
Medalists at the 2019 Pan American Games
21st-century Chilean women